How's Your Process? (Work) is the second studio album by alternative rock band Dot Hacker and the first of a two-album series.

Guitarist Clint Walsh says: "We recorded a lot of songs over the last year with the intention of making a single full length album"..."We never actually expected that all of them would make the final sequence. However, we quickly realized there was nothing we felt should be left off."

The album was released on July 1, 2014 on ORG Music label. It was dedicated "in memory of Dorothy Hacker (1920 – 2013)."

Track listing

Personnel 
 Dot Hacker
 Josh Klinghoffer – lead vocals, guitar, keyboards, synthesizers
 Clint Walsh – guitar, backing vocals, synthesizers
 Jonathan Hischke – bass guitar
 Eric Gardner – drums

 Production
 Eric Palmquist – engineer, mixing
 Bernie Grundman – mastering

 Artwork
 Ryszard Horowitz – cover photography 
 Astrelle Johnquest – design

References 

2014 albums
Dot Hacker albums